The Martha’s Vineyard Times is an independently owned weekly community newspaper, published by The MV Times Corp. on the island of Martha’s Vineyard, seven miles off the coast of Southeastern Massachusetts. The newspaper has an average circulation of 15,000, is distributed free of charge to all Island postal customers, and is available for sale at retail locations around the Island.  

The Times’s website has published 100 percent of its weekly content, in addition to web-only material, since it first went live in 2001. The site attracts more than 3 million unique visitors and 4.3 million sessions each year, roughly equally divided among islanders and off-Islanders. The Martha’s Vineyard Times and its staff, and Times special publications have all won multiple awards — including Newspaper of the Year in 2017, 2018, and 2019 — from the New England Newspaper & Press Association.

History
The Martha’s Vineyard Times was founded in the spring of 1984 by five Islanders in the midst of great population growth (45 percent between 1970 and 1980, 30 percent between 1980 and 1990, and another 30 percent between 1990 and 2000) and social and economic change in the Vineyard community personal per capita income increased more than sixfold in the same period. In the obituary for Robert “Bob” Carroll, retired Times editor Doug Cabral said, “They believed that the Vineyard needed a newspaper that would take an aggressive interest in the year-round residents and the year-round economy of the Vineyard, both of which they thought were under-represented,” and so took direct aim at the editorial convictions of the venerable and much admired weekly Vineyard Gazette, which was deeply committed to conservation and preservation of the Vineyard’s bucolic past.

The challenges of publishing a comprehensive and responsible community newspaper in a competitive market proved daunting to the founders, and in 1991 they sold The Martha’s Vineyard Times to their editor Doug Cabral and his wife Molly. An early challenge was the decision to convert the Times from a paid circulation broadsheet, like the Vineyard Gazette, to a free, mailed, tabloid-size newspaper. The new competition was met with consternation and disdain from the Gazette’s leadership, but the strategy proved successful. In combination with comprehensive community readership and a broad editorial constituency, the business advantages of total market circulation and advertiser reach provided the financial support necessary to sustain a viable model for community journalism.

Staff and Organization 
The Martha’s Vineyard Times employs approximately 20 full-time staff year-round, along with a number of freelance and part-time staff. Responsibility for all editorial products lies with Jamie Kageleiry, associate publisher. All print and web products are published by Martha’s Vineyard Times Corp., which is owned by Peter and Barbara Oberfest, who serve as publishers. The Oberfests became partners in The Times with Doug and Molly Cabral in 1995 and became sole owners in May 2014.

References

External links
The Martha's Vineyard Times website

Newspapers published in Massachusetts
Publications established in 1984
Weekly newspapers published in the United States